Raskit is the sixth studio album by English rapper Dizzee Rascal. It was released on 21 July 2017 by Dirtee Stank Recordings and Island Records. It is his first studio album in four years since The Fifth (2013). It was produced entirely by Dizzee Rascal alongside notable producers such as Cardo, Donae'o, Salva, Teddy Samba, The Arcade, The HeavyTrackerz and Valentino Khan, among others.

Critical reception

Raskit received generally favourable reviews from critics upon release. At Metacritic, which assigns a normalised rating out of 100 to reviews from mainstream publications, the album received an average score of 78, based on 12 reviews. Ben Cardew of Pitchfork stated that Raskit converges grime with hip hop and "retains The Fifths deliberately divided identity, with beats that fall between grime’s crude electronic minimalism and trap’s skittering intricacy". Jordan Bassett of NME labelled Raskit a "brilliant return to grime" for Dizzee Rascal and "hasn’t sounded this vital in years". Andy Cowan of Mojo stated: "If 2013’s The Fifth was a rare, guest-heavy misstep that polished off rough edges to brazenly target a transatlantic audience, Raskit junks its predecessor’s egregious schmaltz for marauding bass and spartan trap backings."

Track listingNotes'
  signifies an additional producer.

Personnel
Credits adapted from Tidal.

 
 Cardo – producer 
 Colin Brain – assistant engineer 
 Dan Farber – mixing, producer 
 Darkness – producer 
 Deputy – producer 
 Donae'o – producer 
 Dizzee Rascal – executive producer, mixing, producer 
 Jake Gordon – mixing 
 Matthew "Formatt" DeFreitas – mixing 
 Mike Marsh – engineer 
 Niko – vocals 
 Salva – producer , 
 Teddy Samba – mixing , producer 
 The Arcade – producer 
 The HeavyTrackerz – producer 
 Wilfred Kouassi – producer 
 Valentino Khan – producer , engineer, mixer, programmer

Charts

References

2017 albums
Dizzee Rascal albums
Island Records albums
Albums produced by Cardo